Returning Jesus is the fourth studio album by British art rock band No-Man, released on the 3rd Stone records in 27 March 2001.

History
A collection of ambitious songs which combined classical, jazz, soul and ambient influences in an original and emotional way, the album received good reviews in Q, Uncut and Classic rock. Additionally, having signed to Lava/WEA, the increasing profile of Steven Wilson's work with Porcupine Tree brought the No-Man name to a new audience.

One of the guest musicians on the album was Porcupine Tree's Colin Edwin, who played double bass.

Unusually, the tracks "All That You Are" and "Carolina Skeletons" were released as singles, in the first case two years after the album's release (February 2003) and in the latter three years prior to it (October 1998).

In August 2006, the album was released in a limited edition triple vinyl format on the Dutch label, Tonefloat. This edition included outtakes, demos and b-sides taken from the recording sessions (which spanned 7 years).

A Kscope label double CD reissue of the album was available from 3 November 2017, featuring a new remaster by Steven Wilson. This double CD contains the original album, plus a bonus CD of b-sides (EPs Carolina Skeletons from 1998 and All That You Are from 2003), demos and alternate versions (including some previously unreleased recordings), presented in a digipak with a 16-page booklet with sleeve notes by Tim Bowness and additional artwork and photography from regular collaborator Carl Glover. The first 500 orders came with an exclusive postcard signed by Tim Bowness and Steven Wilson.

In keeping with other No-Man releases, "Something Falls" reuses previous Steven Wilson music, reinterpreting the guitar progression from "Spiral Circus" (on The Sky Moves Sideways by his main band, Porcupine Tree). Additionally, opening song "Only Rain" samples strings from the end of "Watching Over Me", a track on the 1994 No-Man album Flowermouth.

Track listing

Vinyl LP 'Complete Sessions' Edition

Personnel 

Tim Bowness – vocals, words
Steven Wilson – instruments

with:

Steve Jansen – drums, percussion
Colin Edwin – bass & double bass
David Kosten – synth drone / ride cymbal / co-production (1)
Theo Travis – saxophone (7), flute (8)
Ian Carr – trumpet (1)
Ian Dixon – trumpet (2), flugelhorn (3)
Ben Christophers – acoustic guitar (1)

References

External links
No-Man's Official Website

2001 albums
No-Man albums